Big Boy Restaurant Group, LLC is an American restaurant chain headquartered in Warren, Michigan. Frisch's Big Boy Restaurants is a restaurant chain with its headquarters in Cincinnati, Ohio. The Big Boy name, design aesthetic, and menu were previously licensed to a number of regional franchisees.

Big Boy began as Bob's Pantry in 1936 by Bob Wian in Glendale, California. The restaurants became known as "Bob's", "Bob's Drive-Ins", "Bob's, Home of the Big Boy Hamburger", and (commonly as) Bob's Big Boy. It became a local chain under that name and nationally under the Big Boy name, franchised by Robert C. Wian Enterprises. Marriott Corporation bought Big Boy in 1967. One of the larger franchise operators, Elias Brothers, purchased the chain from Marriott in 1987, moved the headquarters of the company to Warren, Michigan, and operated it until bankruptcy was declared in 2000. During the bankruptcy, the chain was sold to investor Robert Liggett, Jr., who took over as chairman, renamed the company Big Boy Restaurants International and maintained the headquarters in Warren. In 2018, Big Boy was sold to a group of Michigan investors and renamed Big Boy Restaurant Group, with David Crawford as chairman, CEO, and co-owner of the new company. The company is the operator or franchisor for 66 Big Boy restaurants in the United States and two in Thailand. In January 2020, Tamer Afr replaced Crawford as chairman, CEO, and co-owner.

Immediately after Liggett's purchase, Big Boy Restaurants International—then known as Liggett Restaurant Enterprises—negotiated an agreement with the other large franchise operator, Frisch's Restaurants. The Big Boy trademarks in Kentucky, Indiana, and most of Ohio and Tennessee transferred to Frisch's ownership; all other Frisch's territories transferred to Liggett. Thus Frisch's is no longer a franchisee, but Big Boy Restaurant Group and Frisch's are now independent co-registrants of the Big Boy name and trademark. Frisch's operates or franchises 84 Big Boy restaurants in the United States.

Big Boy Japan, also independent of Big Boy Restaurant Group, operates 274 restaurants in Japan.

Origin

The Big Boy mascot

The chain is best known for its trademark chubby boy with a pompadour hairstyle wearing red-and-white checkered overalls holding a Big Boy sandwich (double-decker cheeseburger). The inspiration for Big Boy's name, as well as the model for its mascot, was Richard Woodruff of Glendale, California. When he was six years old, Woodruff walked into the diner Bob's Pantry as Bob Wian was attempting to name his new hamburger. Wian said, "Hello, Big Boy" to Woodruff, and the name stuck. Warner Bros. animation artist Ben Washam sketched Richard's caricature, which became the character seen on the company trademark.

In 1955, Bob Wian hired Manfred Bernhard, son of graphic designer Lucian Bernhard, to create a new public image for Big Boy. Bernhard was not impressed with Washam's mascot, saying it was sloppy and had a moronic expression. The "West Coast Big Boy" mascot was revised, fiberglass statues molded, schemes created for menus and building designs, and a comic book for children launched.

In 1951, Bob Wian's original franchisee Dave Frisch developed a slightly different Big Boy character. He was slimmer, wore a side cap, saddle shoes and striped overalls. Having reddish or blonde hair he was portrayed in a running pose. Known as the "East Coast Big Boy", he was copyrighted by Frisch's and used for statues and comic books for Frisch's, and its subfranchisees Manners and Azar's. Before 1954, Parkette (Shoney's) used both versions, though never together. Since 1956, the Wian "West Coast Big Boy" design was used exclusively by all franchisees other than Frisch's, Manners and Azar's. In the late 1960s, both characters were redrawn to appear similar, incorporating the checkered outfit, pompadour and hamburger above the raised arm from the West Coast design, and the running pose and direction of the East Coast design. In the 1980s, the hamburger was removed from the West Coast design; representing a de-emphasis of the hamburger in North American Big Boy restaurants, it also accommodated the Japanese Big Boy restaurants, which do not serve hamburgers on a bun.

Big Boy statues

Early versions of the West Coast Big Boy statues were gigantic, measuring up to 16 feet tall with later versions as short as 4 feet. The early statues always included the Big Boy hamburger above mascot's raised right arm; much later versions eliminated the hamburger with both arms clutching the suspenders instead. The hamburger remained a part of the Frisch's East Coast statues, though the slingshot was eliminated from the figure's back pocket. Although still used by that chain, some Frisch's restaurants currently display the West Coast statue instead.

Occasionally Big Boy statues have come into conflict with local zoning ordinances. In 2002, Tony Matar, a Big Boy franchisee in Canton, Michigan was cited in violation of local sign ordinances. The town claimed the statue was a prohibited second sign; Matar asserted that the 7 foot statue was a sculpture, not a sign. A 2004 compromise allows the existing statue to remain with the words "Big Boy" removed from the figure's bib. When a Brighton, Michigan franchise closed in early 2015 for financial reasons, zoning codes caused the entire sign—topped with a rotating Big Boy statue—be taken down before the restaurant could be reopened. In contrast the planning commission in Norco, California—known as Horsetown USA—was concerned that the statue was not western enough. In response, the restaurant's Big Boy statue is now outfitted wearing a cowboy hat and boots.

A few other modified statues are in official use. In Cincinnati's Great American Ball Park, a Frisch's statue is painted wearing a 1970s Reds baseball uniform with a Reds ball cap added. Frisch's Big Boy hamburgers are sold at two of the park's concession booths. Rather than modifying a typical statue, the Big Boy restaurants in Manistique and St. Ignace, Michigan display full scale moose statues dressed in checkered overalls with "Big Boy" printed across the chest. To conform with Gaylord, Michigan's Alpine theme, the local restaurant's statue previously wore a green Tyrolean hat. (The restaurant was rebuilt in 2016, and no longer displays the modified statue.)

In March 2017, Frisch's unveiled a restyled statue. The new statue resembles the West Coast design but wears striped overalls like the original East Coast Big Boy. The debut statue wearing a Reds uniform is placed near the existing statue at Great American Ball Park; another is planned for an unnamed Frisch's restaurant. Frisch's will gradually swap the new statues for existing restaurant statues in need of repair.

Because of the closing or separation of former Big Boy restaurants, many West Coast statues were acquired by private individuals, often traded through eBay. Smaller versions of the statues are sold as coin banks and bobblehead figures. The three dimensional Big Boy figure was also used on early ash trays, salt and pepper shakers, wooden counter displays and as small unpainted pewter models.

Gigantic air inflatable Big Boy figures are available and typically used for restaurant openings and special promotions, where permitted.

Adventures of the Big Boy comic book 

Adventures of the Big Boy (initially The Adventures of Big Boy) was a promotional comic book given free to children visiting the restaurants. Intended to "give the kids something to do while they waited for their food", the book involves the escapades of Big Boy, his girlfriend Dolly and dog Nugget.  From the comic books children could also join the Big Boy Club, a kids' club offering them free Big Boy hamburgers, decoder cards, pin-back buttons and other premiums. The serial – sometimes called "King of the Giveaways" – once had distribution estimated at three million copies.

Manfred Bernhard commissioned Timely Comics to produce the book. In the first year, Adventures of the Big Boy was managed by Sol Brodsky, written by Stan Lee and drawn by Bill Everett, Brodsky, and Dan DeCarlo. DeCarlo continued drawing in the second year and Lee writing the series through 1961. For 17 years, starting in the mid-1970s, Manny Stallman drew the (Marriott) series, followed by Bob Bindig who drew the series until 1995.

Variations 
Because of the distinct East and West Coast Big Boy mascots, dual versions of Adventures were produced, identical except for the detail of the Big Boy figure. In July 1969, the versions merged, and a fluffy brown haired Big Boy appeared. In 1976, Shoney's began publishing their own series instead. Contracted to Paragon Products, this version featured an older, leaner Big Boy, with his siblings Katie and Tripp replacing Dolly and Nugget, and was adopted by the JB's and Azar's Big Boy franchises.  After 75 issues, it became Shoney's Fun and Adventure Magazine introducing a Shoney's mascot ("Uncle Ed" bear) in place of Big Boy, allowing it to serve Shoney's non-Big Boy restaurants.

Cancellation 
In 1996, after 39 years and 466 issues, Big Boy cancelled the comic book and hired Craig Yoe's Yoe! Studio to revamp the characters and produce a magazine styled replacement. After 63 issues, the Big Boy Magazine was itself cancelled in 2008.

Food

The Big Boy hamburger

The signature Big Boy hamburger is the original double deck hamburger.

The novel hamburger started as a joke. In February 1937, some local big band musicians, who were regular customers of Bob's Pantry, visited the restaurant. When ordering, bass player Stewie Strange asked,  "How about something different, something special?" [emphasis added]. Bob Wian improvised, creating the first (then unnamed) Big Boy, intending the thing "look ridiculous, like a leaning tower". Demand for "the special" soared but Wian sought a "snappy" name, which became Big Boy. In 1938, the Big Boy hamburger cost 15¢. In 2018, the Big Boy cost $6.49 in Michigan.
Several slogans were used from the 1950s through the 1970s to promote the Big Boy hamburger, such as, "A Meal in One on a Double–Deck Bun" and "Twice as Big, Twice as Good". On menus from that period, it was called, "...the Nationally Famous, Original Double–Deck Hamburger...".

The Big Boy hamburger inspired and was the model for other double deck hamburgers. This includes McDonald's Big Mac, Burger Chef's Big Shef and Burger King's Big King.

The Big Boy consists of two thin beef patties placed on a three-layer bun with lettuce, a single slice of American cheese, and either mayonnaise and red relish (a combination of sweet pickle relish, ketchup and chili sauce), Big Boy special sauce (often called thousand island dressing) or (at Frisch's, Manners and Azar's) tartar sauce on one or each slice of bun. (Regardless, the Big Boy condiment used was often simply referred to as "special sauce" on menus chainwide.) Wian used a sesame seed bun while Frisch's used a plain bun and included pickles. The Big Boy hamburger originally called for a quarter pound (4 ounces) of fresh ground beef, but later, franchisees were permitted to use frozen beef patties, and the minimum content reduced to a fifth of a pound to offset increasing food costs. Other specifications were exacting, such as the bun's bottom section being 1½  inches high and the center section ¾ inches, and 1½  ounces of shredded lettuce used.

Originally, the Big Boy hamburger was the only common menu item required of all Big Boy franchisees.

Other core menu items

Just as Bob Wian's Big Boy hamburger was served by all franchises, the early franchises also contributed signature menu items. Frisch's provided the "Brawny Lad" and "Swiss Miss" hamburgers, Shoney's contributed the "Slim Jim" sandwich and Hot Fudge Ice Cream Cake, while Strawberry Pie was introduced by Eat'n Park. Hot Fudge Cake and Strawberry Pie remain popular dessert items chainwide but other items were not necessarily offered by all franchises, and franchises would sometimes change the item's name: The "Slim Jim" became the "Buddie Boy" at Frisch's, and Elby's renamed the "Swiss Miss" as the "Brawny Swiss". Similarly, when franchisees left Big Boy, they would typically rebrand the Big Boy hamburger: it became the "Superburger" (Eat'n Park), the "Buddy Boy" (Lendy's), the "Big Ben" (Franklin's), and the "Elby Double Deck hamburger" (Elby's).  Shoney's reintroduced the "Classic Double Decker", somewhat different than the Big Boy, about a decade after leaving.

Big Boy offers breakfast, burgers and sandwiches, salads, dinner combinations, and various desserts.

Philosophy and practices

Bob Wian developed rules and philosophies about how Big Boy should operate. Besides the Big Boy hamburger and  its construction, he attributed most of his success and that of his franchisees to following these rules. His fundamental restaurant principles were: "serve the best quality food, at moderate prices, in spotless surroundings, with courtesy and hospitality." He believed "the customer is always right" and instructed employees that, "if any food item is not satisfactory, return it cheerfully and apologize for the error". Wian said he had five basic rules for building his business: "be a good place to work for, sell to, buy from, and invest in. And be a good neighbor in the community." He also attributed the growth to, "capable management and a conservative policy of not trying to seat more people than can be served or opening more restaurants than can be serviced." If some disruption occurred at a restaurant, such as a new manager or renovation, Wian would postpone advertising until operations would return to his standards.

Typical of Big Boy restaurants, Elby's Big Boy used a nine-step process waiting on dining room customers:
 Greet customers within one minute of being seated, serving water and taking beverage orders.
 Serve beverages and take meal orders.
 Call in meal orders to kitchen.
 Place setups (e.g., silverware) and condiments, serve salad items.
 Watch kitchen (number panel) for completed order and promptly serve meals to table.(The kitchen should complete orders within 8 minutes, 10 minutes for steaks.) 
 Check back with customers within a few minutes: "Is everything OK?"
 Return and place check on the table: "I'll return shortly."
 Suggest dessert and take dessert orders.
 Serve desserts or deliver final check, remove empty dishes.

Bob Wian was discerning of employees, hiring wait staff—which he considered a profession—by appearance, intelligence and enthusiasm. He preferred employees with little or no restaurant experience which afforded training in the Big Boy tradition. Wian said that he "conned [employees] into believing in themselves ... I put my cooks in chef's outfits, even though they couldn't boil an egg". Other than wait staff, employees typically started as dishwashers and busboys, and advanced to short-order cooks, and then possibly to management. Bob's Big Boy was one of the first restaurant chains to offer health insurance and profit-sharing to employees.

Bob Wian excelled at franchise relations. He led 20-person training crews to open new Big Boy restaurants, made periodic nationwide tours of the franchises, was available for consultations and claimed to know every manager's name. He also assembled the principal franchisees as board members of the National Big Boy Association to participate in leadership. After Wian left, some Big Boy operators began to question the value of their franchise.

Regional franchises

Operation and history

In addition to the Big Boy name, the "Big Boy" concept, menu, and mascot were originally licensed to a wide number of regional franchise holders (listed in the next section). Because many of the early franchisees were already in the restaurant business when joining Big Boy, "Big Boy" was added to the franchisee name just as the Big Boy hamburger was added to the franchisee's menu. In this sense it is confusing when referring to a chain, as each named franchisee was itself a chain and Big Boy could be considered a chain of chains. People tend to know Big Boy not simply as Big Boy but as the franchise from where they lived such as Bob's Big Boy in California, Shoney's Big Boy in the south or Frisch's Big Boy in much of Ohio, Marc's Big Boy in the Upper Midwest, Elias Brothers' Big Boy (or sometimes just Elias Brothers') in Michigan, among the many others.

Each regional franchisee typically operated a central commissary which prepared or processed foods and sauces to be shipped fresh to their restaurants. However, some items might be prepared at the restaurants daily, such as soups and breading of seafood and onion rings.

Through the 1950s and 1960s, the emphasis changed from drive-in restaurant to coffee shop and family restaurant. New franchisees without existing restaurants signed on. A larger standard menu was developed. Most adopted a common graphic design of menus and promotional items, offered by Big Boy but personalized to the franchise. Stock plans of restaurant designs were provided by Los Angeles architects Armet and Davis or Chicago architectural designer Robert O. Burton, and modified as needed.

In the 1960s, Big Boy and other drive-in restaurants could not compete with the spreading fast food restaurants such as McDonald's and Burger King. Big Boy built its last drive-in in 1964 and by 1976, only 5 of the chain's 930 restaurants offered curb service. Big Boy redefined itself as a full service restaurant in contrast to fast food. Nonetheless, in the late 1960s and 1970s, Bob's, Shoney's and JB's also opened Big Boy Jr. stores, designed as fast food operations which offered a limited menu. Sometimes called drive-ins, these junior stores did not use carhops. In 1993, Marc's Big Boy similarly developed Big Boy Express stores using dual drive-thrus and no interior dining area. Two Express stores were built, offered for sale a year later and closed in 1995.

Several franchises also held Kentucky Fried Chicken franchises and sold that chicken in their Big Boy restaurants; these included Marc's, McDowell's, Lendy's and one or more Shoney's subfranchises. The practice was discouraged and Big Boy eventually provided a similar scheme of selling buckets of take out chicken, marketed as Country Style or Country Cousin Chicken. Franchises who resisted the change were forced to remove Kentucky Fried Chicken menu items and physically relocate those operations. However, Marriott sold "Pappy Parker Fried Chicken" in Bob's Big Boys; the Marriott owned brand was also sold in the company's Hot Shoppes and Roy Rogers Restaurants, and later Marriott Hotel Restaurants.

Big Boy's origins as a drive-in restaurant, required a much smaller investment to open and much lower costs to operate: a small building having no dining room or limited counter space. Thus persons of modest assets could become Big Boy operators. It was the profits from these operations which allowed not only additional drive-ins, but operators to build modern restaurants with large pleasant dining rooms. Many of the early successful franchisees would probably not have assets (converted to present value) sufficient to join Big Boy today.

By 1979, there were more than a thousand Big Boy restaurants in the U.S. and Canada, and about 20 franchisees. Shoney's, Elias Brothers and Frisch's—charter franchisees—controlled the vast majority. These mega franchisees paid practically no fees, e.g., Frisch paid $1 per year for its core four state territory. After Bob's, the four original franchisees (in order) were Frisch's, Eat'n Park, Shoney's (originally called "Parkette") and Elias Brothers, all clustered near the state of Ohio. All, including Bob's, remain in operation today, albeit Elias Brothers is simply known as Big Boy, and Eat'n Park and Shoney's dropped Big Boy affiliation in the 1970s and 1980s.

Big Boy developed named franchisees in several ways. Very quickly the Big Boy name and even the Big Boy character were being widely used without permission. Bob Wian, needing Big Boy restaurants operating in multiple states to maintain national (U.S.) trademark protection, offered very generous franchise agreements to Frisch's, Eat'n Park and Parkette (Shoney's). In 1952, Wian instituted a formal franchise process and Elias Brothers became the first such "official" franchisee paying Wian 1% of sales. Bob Wian also settled trademark infringements allowing the rogue operator to become a licensed franchisee, such as McDowell's Big Boy in North Dakota. Franchisees were permitted to subfranchise; these early subfranchisees often used their own name and operated independently: Frisch's licensed Azar's, and Manners; Shoney's licensed Adler's, Arnold's, Becker's, Elby's, Lendy's, Shap's, Tune's, and Yoda's. (An eastern Pennsylvania Elby's franchisee briefly operated as Franklin's Big Boy before dropping Big Boy.)

Acquisitions and mergers also occurred. In the early 1970s, Frisch's acquired Kip's Big Boy; JB's acquired Vip's, Kebo's, Leo's and Bud's which were rebranded JB's. Shoney's acquired the Missouri territory previously assigned to Tote's. After buying Big Boy, Elias Brothers bought Elby's and TJ's. Elby's was unique in leaving and rejoining the Big Boy system. When Marriott purchased Big Boy (Wian Enterprises) in 1967, this included Bob's Big Boy. The name "Bob's" would be used by all Marriott owned Big Boys and became common in parts of the eastern U.S. and elsewhere, far away from Bob's historic territory.

Frisch's now owns the "Big Boy" name in a defined four-state region and its franchisee Azar's closed in 2020. Bob's is licensed Big Boy Restaurant Group. Many of the other former franchise owners (Shoney's, particularly) have expanded into the former territories of other franchise holders.

After buying the Big Boy system from Marriott, Elias Brothers planned to phase out franchise names, only generally realized by Big Boy Restaurants International after 2000. This was intended to strengthen the trademark but also prevent defections, such as happened with Shoney's Big Boy retaining identity as Shoney's. The same occurred with Eat'n Park, Elby's, Lendy's, JB's, and Abdow's who kept their names after leaving Big Boy. Big Boy now permits operators to informally identify by location such as Tawas Bay Big Boy in East Tawas, Michigan.

Unlike most modern franchises, the historic Big Boy franchisees differed somewhat from one another in pricing and menus. After purchasing Big Boy in 1987, Elias Brothers intended to standardize the name and menu, but Bob's, Frisch's and McDowell's (now known as Bismarck Big Boy) continue to offer distinctions from the standard Big Boy menu.

Franchising costs today 

Big Boy Restaurant Group and Frisch's Big Boy Restaurants both continue to offer franchises in their exclusive territories, each having 20 year terms. As of 2014, Big Boy Restaurant Group charged a $40,000 franchise fee, and an ongoing 4% royalty and up to 3% advertising fees based on weekly gross revenue. (In most of Michigan the franchisee pays a 2% advertising fee and must spend an additional 1% on local advertising. Franchisees in the Upper Peninsula of Michigan or outside of Michigan pay a ½% advertising fee and must spend 1½% on local advertising.) As of 2020, Frisch's Big Boy charges a $40,000–$45,000 franchise fee, and an ongoing 4% royalty and 2½% advertising fees on gross revenue. The majority of Big Boy Restaurant Group units are franchised while the majority of Frisch's units are currently company owned. Big Boy Restaurant Group franchise agreements are not renewable but new agreements are required.

Roster of named franchisees

Big Boy restaurants were cobranded with at least 34 different names representing various franchisees. These franchisees are listed below with territories, time span, founders, comic book code (in brackets) and additional notes, as known:

Abdow's (Western and Central Massachusetts, Connecticut, 19631994, founded by George and Ron Abdow and their sister Phyllis Abdow-LaVallee) Abdow's opened as a Hi-Boy franchisee in 1959, bought a Big Boy franchise in 1963 and changed the corporate name to Abdow's Big Boy in 1965. Abdow's left Big Boy in 1994 over menu conflicts with Elias Brothers and value served for the franchise fees, removing 18 restaurants from the national chain. Now defunct, many converted to Elxsi Corporations's Bickfords Family Restaurants or remain vacant.  [N]

Adler's (Lynchburg, Virginia, 1958–1960, founded by Abe Adler) Became a Lendy's Big Boy, when Adler sold the business to Leonard Goldstein of Lendy's.

Arnold's (Folsom, Pennsylvania, 1955–?, founders unknown) Arnold's and Tune's operated in the Philadelphia area.

Azar's (Northern Indiana, Colorado, 1953–2020, founded by brothers Alex, David and George Azar) Opened in Ft. Wayne, Indiana as a Frisch's subfranchise and in 1967 expanded to the Denver, Colorado market. Operated 26 units in 1984. Alex Azar's son, George Azar, became CEO. After closing during the COVID-19 pandemic, the last Azar's Big Boy closed permanently. Alex Azar became a member of the Big Boy Board of Directors.  [T]

Becker's (Rochester and Buffalo, New York, 19561965, founded by Abe Becker) Shoney's opened a restaurant in Rochester in the mid-1950s which may have become Becker's Big Boy. By 1957, Becker's was operating four Big Boy restaurants in Greater Rochester. Trying to expand too quickly created a financial crisis and the end of the franchise.

Bob's (California, Arizona, Nevada, Alaska, Hawaii, Washington, Oregon, Virginia, Maryland, Delaware, Pennsylvania, New Jersey, Vermont; and Indiana, Ohio, Florida, New York and Pennsylvania toll roads and airport locations operated in several states by the Marriott Corp. or others, 1936+, founded by Robert C. "Bob" Wian) The original Big Boy chain, which in Wian's time was confined to Southern California, Arizona and Nevada. Because Marriott developed and acquired Big Boy restaurants elsewhere, principally the northeastern U.S., Bob's developed a more diverse territory and identity. Bob's in Nevada and Arizona were purchased by JB's Big Boy. Currently, Bob's operates only five restaurants – all in Southern California. Bob's units are the only operators under the domain of the Big Boy Restaurant Group now permitted to use a franchise name for public identity. Wian was the original chairman of the Big Boy Board of Directors.  [A]

Bud's (Montana, Wyoming, 1966197?) Operated two units. Acquired by JBs in the 1970s.

Chez Chap (Westmount, a suburb of Montreal, Quebec, 1978?, founded by Chapman Baehler) Baehler was Bob Wian's stepson.

Don's (Burlington, Vermont, 1984, founded by Donald Allard) One of several chain restaurants operated by Allard. Restaurant was rebranded as Bob's Big Boy about 1986, and closed, with plans to construct a Red Lobster Restaurant on the site in 1991. As of 2020, there has been an Olive Garden on that site for some years.

Eat'n Park (metro Pittsburgh, 19491975, founded by Larry Hatch and William Peters) Hatch and Peters were supervisors at Isaly's in Pittsburgh. On Isaly's business in Cincinnati, Hatch saw the success of the Frisch's Big Boy Drive-In prompting contact with founder Bob Wian, who needed national exposure to gain national trademark protection. Within a year Eat'n Park opened as the second Big Boy franchisee. When the 25 year franchise agreement expired Eat'n Park dropped Big Boy, attributed to the loss of drive-in popularity but primarily motivated by the end of the $1 per year license fee the franchise had enjoyed. Pittsburgh area Big Boy rights were reassigned to Elby's in 1977.  [D]

Elby's (Northern West Virginia, Pennsylvania, Eastern Ohio, Maryland, 19561984, 19882000, founded by brothers George, Ellis and Michael Boury) Named after a brand of flavoring syrup sold by the Bourys' restaurant supply business. Originally acquired the Big Boy rights to northern West Virginia through Shoney's. In 1960 Elby's expanded into Ohio, licensed through Frisch's. Six years later, Bob Wian awarded Elby's franchisor rights to Pennsylvania, excluding the Pittsburgh and Philadelphia areas; Pittsburgh was awarded Elby's in 1977. When Frisch's refused existing terms on a fourth Ohio unit in 1971, Elby's withdrew from Big Boy affiliation in Ohio, leading to a long running trademark battle by Frisch's. In August 1984 Elby's paid $500 thousand to buy out its Big Boy franchise, four months after Shoney's—franchisor for Elby's West Virginia stores—broke affiliation.  Opened units in Maryland after leaving Big Boy. The Elby's name and most company restaurants were sold to Elias Brothers in 1988 becoming Big Boys again. (George and Michael Boury retained nine Ohio units that could not become Big Boys because of nearby Frisch's operations; they were rebranded as Shoney's restaurants until placed for sale in 1993.) Although officially stripped of the Elby's name, identity was so strong that the Elby's name continued in print advertisements. The last remaining Elby's closed in 2000 in response to the Elias Brothers financial crisis.  [E]

Elias Brothers (Michigan, Northeastern Ohio, Ontario, Canada, 19522000, founded by Fred, John and Louis Elias) In 1938 the brothers opened Fred's Chili Bowl in Detroit and later the Dixie Drive-In in Hazel Park, which would become the first Elias Brothers Big Boy. Considered the "first official franchisee" because they were the first to formally apply to Bob Wian. Worked with Wian, Schoenbaum and Manfred Bernhard to create the 1956 Big Boy character design and launch the comic book. Owned the Big Boy system from 1987 through 2000 when the bankrupt company was sold to Robert Liggett. Many Michigan units continue operations stripped of the Elias Brothers name and these are the vast majority (90%) of Big Boy Restaurant Group's Big Boy stores. Fred Elias became a member of the Big Boy Board of Directors.  [F]

Franklin's (Eastern Pennsylvania, 19661976, founded by Marvin and Joseph Franklin) Subfranchised by and originally operated as Elby's. Sued Elby's in 1975 for receiving commissions from approved vendors. inflating prices of supplies, and using continued franchising as an incentive. Elby's denied the charges, which were settled out of court in 1978. Franklin discontinued use of the Elby's name in 1976, but initially continued to operate as Big Boy Restaurants. Elby's sued Franklin's. In August 1978, a federal court cancelled Franklin's contracts with Elby's, awarded Elby's an undisclosed cash settlement and enjoined Franklin's from use of the "Elby's" and "Big Boy" names, food items, recipes and other materials. Nonetheless, Franklin's renamed the "Big Boy" the "Big Ben" and adopted a Benjamin Franklin theme. Elby's subsequently built new restaurants adjacent to several Franklin's units. The 12 unit chain was sold to Hershey's Foods and Friendly's Restaurants in 1985.

Frejlach's (Illinois, 1954196?, founded by Irvin Frejlach) Added Big Boy to their established chain of ice cream shops. Unlike other franchisees, the stores did not directly use the Big Boy name; they remained Frejlach's Ice Cream Shoppes not Frejlach's Big Boy. The company also owned rights to McDonald's restaurants in Cook County (Chicago), Illinois which were sold back to Ray Kroc in 1956. Irvin's brother Lucian "Lou" Frejlach became a member of the Big Boy Board of Directors.

Frisch's (Ohio, Kentucky, Indiana, Tennessee; Florida until the early 1990s, 1947+, founded by David Frisch) The Cincinnati restaurant chain and first franchisee, began serving Big Boy hamburgers in 1946, but opened their first Big Boy Drive-In restaurant in 1948; Frisch's now operates 96 Big Boys and franchises 25 Big Boys to others. Frisch's subfranchised to Azar's and Manners, which used the Frisch's styled Big Boy, to Milton and David Bennett in 1955, who operate as Frisch's in northwest Ohio and also licensed Elby's to operate three Big Boy units in the upper Ohio Valley until 1971. In 2001 Frisch's became the perpetual owner of the Big Boy trademark in most of Ohio, Kentucky, Indiana and Tennessee, and received $1.2 million to relinquish all other Big Boy territories to Big Boy Restaurants International, to whom Frisch's is no longer a franchisee or licensee. On August 24, 2015, Frisch's was sold to an Atlanta-based private equity fund, ending family ownership and control of the chain.  [X]

JB's (Arizona, Utah, Idaho, Montana, South Dakota, Wyoming, Washington, California, New Mexico, Nevada, Nebraska, Kansas, New Jersey, Rhode Island, Massachusetts, Connecticut; 19611988, founded by Jack M. Broberg.) The first JB's Big Boy opened in 1961 in Provo, Utah. In the 1970s JB's expanded by acquiring neighboring Big Boy franchisees: Vip's, Leo's, Kebo's and Bud's. After Marriott refused granting additional territory, in 1984, JB's sued to leave Big Boy. The parties settled, JB's paying $7 million in exchange for additional territory, including central and northern California, Oregon, Washington, Nevada and Arizona where it operated as Bob's Big Boy; JB's also purchased 29 existing Bob's Big Boy restaurants from Marriott. Citing a lack of benefit except use of the Big Boy symbol for its over $1 million annual franchise fees, in 1988 JB's allowed its Big Boy franchise to expire, removing 110 units from the Big Boy system. As of December 2016, fifteen JB's Restaurants operate in five states.  [H]

JB's (Canada - Ontario, Alberta and Quebec, 19691979, founded by John Bitove, Sr.) Bitove, a well known Canadian businessman, was the franchisee for Canada generally, along with Roy Rogers Restaurants, both Marriott owned brands. JB's of Canada grew to 32 Big Boy restaurants before selling to Elias Brothers.

Kebo's (Seattle and Tacoma, Washington area before JB's dba Bob's, ?1974, founded by W. Keith Grant.) "Kebo" came from the owners, Keith, Ed and Bob. Two units were sold to JB's in 1974.

Ken's (Maryland, Washington DC, 1963?, founded by Bill Bemis) named in honor of Bill Bemis' father Ken Bemis, who founded the White Log Coffee Shop chain. Three Maryland Ken's Big Boys operated in 1969. "Ken's" became "Bob's" in the early 1970s.  [K]

Kip's (Texas, Oklahoma, Kansas, 19581991, founded Fred Bell, Thomas W. Holman and James Reed) Bell owned and operated Kip's of Texas, while Holman and Reed owned and operated Kip's of Oklahoma and Kansas. Acquired by Frisch's in 1972. Kip's territory was transferred to Big Boy Restaurants International in 2001. Bell became an original member of the Big Boy Board of Directors.  [B]

Lendy's (Western Virginia, 19551964, founded by Leonard Goldstein) Owned by Goldstein but operated as Shoney's 1955–1959. Territory proximity to Yoda's angered Goldstein and concurrent franchise with Kentucky Fried Chicken antagonized franchisor Alex Schoenbaum, prompting Lendy's to leave Big Boy. Renamed the "Big Boy" hamburger as the "Buddy Boy" and created a Buddy Boy mascot similar to Frisch's Big Boy character. Goldstein replaced the Big Boy statues with statues of Buddie Boy.

Leo's (Spokane, Washington, Montana, 19661971, founded by Leo A. Hansen, Jr.) The first Leo's Big Boy opened in Great Falls, Montana in 1966. Grew to four units before being acquired by and renamed JB's in 1971, Hansen becoming a vice-president of JB's Big Boy.

Manners (Northeastern Ohio (Cleveland TV market), 19541979, founded by Robert L. and Ramona Manners) Franchisee through Frisch's, used the Frisch styled mascot design. Like Frisch's, Manners was already established having opened Manners Drive-In in 1939, 15 years before becoming a Big Boy franchisee. Paid Frisch's $10 per month for each location. In 1968 Manners Big Boy was sold to Consolidated Foods (now known as Sara Lee Corporation). Marriott purchased the 39 units in 1974 and five years later dropped the name "Manners". Marriott sold 26 remaining restaurants to Elias Brothers in 1985.  [W]

Marc's (Wisconsin, Iowa, Minnesota, Illinois, 19581995, founded by Ben Marcus and Gene Kilburg) Owned by the Marcus Corporation, Marc's Big Boy debuted in Milwaukee in November 1958. The chain grew to 4 units by 1962, 22 units by 1970, doubling this number within 4 years and eventually operated as many as 64 Big Boys over a 4 state territory. Among these, acquiring Illinois Top's Big Boy restaurants by 1974—rebranding those in Chicago suburbs Marc's. In 1989, Marc's Big Boy Corporation was renamed Marc's Restaurants and a two-year experiment launched completely removing Big Boy at two of its stores, the test demonstrating no effect on business. In 1992, the Marc's format was upscaled and renamed Marc's Big Boy Cafes; in 1993 13 Big Boy Cafes were converted to Marc's Cafe and Coffee Mills, and the company launched 2 Big Boy Express drive-thru stores. The following year, the 13 Cafe and Coffee Mill restaurants were sold to a group of employees, with 3 remaining Big Boys and 2 Big Boy Express units offered for sale. In 1995, the company closed its last Big Boy operation. Some former units later operated as Annie's American Cafe and as Perkins Restaurants. However, in 2017 the Marcus Corporation sold Big Boy hamburgers at the Kil@wat restaurant in its downtown Milwaukee hotel; in March 2017, the sandwich is priced at $11 on the lunch menu and $12 on the dinner menu both served with fries.  [J] Now known as Aria Café and Bar at Saint Kate hotel, as of 2019 the Big Boy goes for $15.  [J]

Mark's (Hyattsville, Maryland, 19601962?) A single unit existed at 3050 East-West Parkway, Hyattsville, which was a Ken's Big Boy in 1964.

McDowell's (North Dakota, 19541960 independently as "Big Boy Drive-Inn", 1960+ as franchise, founded by Harley McDowell)  A trademark infringement suit against McDowell was filed by Wian in 1959 ultimately resulting in a franchise agreement. Operates exclusively as a drive through. McDowell's name was dropped and the remaining store is now called the Bismarck Big Boy. Along with Big Boy hamburgers, the single restaurant sells flying pizza-burgers and french fries by the pound with chicken gravy.  [L]

Mr. B's (New Hampshire, Vermont, Maine, 19631969, founded by Manfred Bernhard) Operated a restaurant in Keene, New Hampshire and Brattleboro, Vermont.

 Shap's (Chattanooga, Tennessee, 19591964?, founded by I. Shapiro, Pem Cooley, and E. D. Latimer) Franchised by Shoney's. Shap's was abbreviated for Shapiro's. Operated two small units in Chattanooga. Latimer bought out the other partners and changed the name to its franchisor's, Shoney's.

 Shoney's/Parkette (Tennessee, Alabama, Arkansas, Mississippi, Louisiana, Georgia, Virginia, South Carolina, North Carolina, West Virginia, Maryland, Missouri, New York, Philadelphia, PA, 19521984, founded by Alex Schoenbaum), Originally called the Parkette, in 1952 it became Parkette Big Boy Shoppes. An unrelated "Parkette Drive-In" had opened in Kentucky so in 1954, a public contest for a new name resulted in Parkette becoming Shoney's, which was also a reference to founder Alex "Shoney" Schoenbaum. Shoney's also subfranchised to Arnold's, Becker's, Elby's, Lendy's, Shap's, Tune's, and Yoda's., and many using the Shoney's name. Ray Danner, the Nashville Shoney's franchisee purchased the company in 1971 and five years later dropped Big Boy from the company name. In April 1984 Shoney's—by then the largest Big Boy franchisee with 392 units—paid $13 million to break its contract with Big Boy, allowing expansion into Frisch's and other franchisees' Big Boy territories. Schoenbaum became a member of the Big Boy Board of Directors.  [M][P]

Ted's (Rhode Island, 1964–?, founded by Edmund D. Fuller III)

TJ's (Rochester, Batavia and Syracuse, New York, 1972?, founded by Anthony T. Kolinski, John Gazda and John Giamartino) Grew to 9 stores by 1986. TJ's was purchased by Big Boy (Elias Brothers). Elias closed 4 stores in 1992 and sold one Syracuse store to a local investor. It closed 3 more Syracuse restaurants in 1994.

Tops (Illinois, 19561993, founded by Lucian Frejlach) Operated primarily in the suburbs of Chicago. By 1974, the Chicago area stores became Marc's Big Boys, while the central Illinois units remained Tops.  [Q]

Tote's (Missouri, 1964–197?, founded by Edward R. Todtenbier) Todtenbier was a Frisch's franchisee in Anderson, Indiana, and planned to open 33 Tote's Big Boys in Missouri, 9 in the St. Louis area. In 1972 the Missouri Big Boy territory was reassigned to Shoney's.  [U]

Tune's (Philadelphia and Levittown, Pennsylvania, 1956–1963, founded by Jack Engel) In the mid to late 1950s Alex Schoenbaum seeded various franchises including Tune's. Two drive-in restaurants opened. By the early 1960s, the Levittown unit closed and the other was rebranded as Shoney's.

Vip's (New Mexico, Texas, Wyoming, 19621982. founded by Daniel T. Hogan and James O'Conner) Vip's refers to two distinct restaurant chains. The Big Boy franchisee relevant here, Vip's Big Boy of New Mexico, was acquired by JB's Big Boy in 1972 but continued using the Vip's name until rebranded in 1982. The other, Vip's Restaurants of Salem, Oregon, was not a Big Boy franchisee but sold units to JB's Big Boy, which operated them as Bob's Big Boy. The non-Big Boy, Salem-based chain had 53 locations at its peak, all sold and rebranded, including 35 to Denny's in 1982 and 16 to JB's in 1984. [R]

Yoda's (Western Virginia, founded by Jack Young and Bill Schroeder) Young was Leonard Goldstein's (Lendy's) brother-in-law. Merged with Lendy's.

Outside the United States 

Mady's Big Boy of Windsor, Ontario, was not a franchisee, though sometimes identified as one and using a similar looking mascot. In 1965 Bob Wian sued Mady's for trademark infringement but failed because (his) Big Boy was judged not widely known in Canada. The case is considered important in Canadian and international trademark law. In 1973 Elias Brothers bought Mady's and established an Elias Big Boy on Mady's original site. John Bitove, Sr. owned the rights to Big Boy for the remainder of Canada, which he sold to Elias Brothers in 1979. During the mid to late 1980's there was one in Nassau, Bahamas.

Big Boy also operated (or planned to open) restaurants in Egypt, Saudi Arabia, Spain, Brazil, the Philippines and Thailand.

Japan

Outside of North America, Big Boy Japan owns and operates 274 Big Boy Hamburger Steak & Grill Restaurants in Japan. Founded in 1977, Big Boy Japan now also operates 45 Victoria Station restaurants in Japan and is a subsidiary of Zénsho Holdings Co., Ltd. The Japanese Big Boy Restaurants do not offer the Big Boy hamburger or most other American Big Boy menu items, offering a distinct menu instead. They also offer beer and wine. Zensho had purchased Big Boy Japan from the ailing Daiei in 2002 for 8.65 billion yen. Like Frisch, Big Boy Japan operates independently of the Big Boy Restaurant Group.

Southeast Asia and Western Pacific
In 2019, Singapore-based Destination Eats signed a franchise agreement with the Big Boy Restaurant Group to initially open restaurants in Thailand, and later in Australia, China, Indonesia, Vietnam, Singapore, and the Philippines. In May 2020, the first Thai Big Boy restaurant opened in Bangkok, operated as a delivery only service due to the COVID-19 pandemic. A second restaurant was opened in Pattaya in October 2020. The company is obligated to open 70 restaurants in its overall territory.

A previous franchise briefly operated at the beginning of the 21st century with three Big Boy restaurants in Bangkok and one in the southern beach town of Pattaya, but the business ultimately failed because the native Thai customers did not understand nor appreciate American-style food at that time. The restaurants adapted the menu to local tastes. Some Thai customers regarded the Big Boy statues as religious icons or had superstitions about them.

Big Boy Restaurants International 
The previous Michigan-based owner of the Big Boy chain, which chiefly franchised previous Elias Brothers Big Boy restaurants in Michigan, has suffered a gradual loss of franchised restaurants. About 175 Big Boys existed in July 2006, compared to 76 in July 2019.

On April 16, 2017, the last Big Boy restaurant in the city of Detroit closed. The Big Boy in Fenton, Michigan, was expected to close in 2017. Both properties have been sold to developers. Likewise, in 2016, the Jackson, Michigan, Big Boy closed after the site was purchased by a developer.

Other franchisees simply left the Big Boy chain. In April 2017, the Danville Big Boy, the only unit in Illinois, dropped Big Boy and rebranded as the Border Cafe. In 2016 both the Ann Arbor, Michigan, restaurant (on North Zeeb Road) and the restaurant in Houghton Lake, Michigan continued to operate but not as Big Boy restaurants. The Tecumseh and Alma, Michigan restaurants announced they will allow their franchise agreements to expire on November 1, 2017, and early 2018, respectively, and both will continue to operate independently. The Marine City, Michigan Big Boy closed in February 2018, to reopen independently by a new owner. However, in the same month, Big Boy added a new franchisee, an existing restaurant reopening as a Big Boy, in Woodhaven, Michigan. In April 2018, the Coldwater, Michigan location closed, media sources noting multiple health code violations and poor customer reviews.

Company-owned restaurants have also closed for under-performance.

Big Boy Restaurant Group 
In 2018, Big Boy was sold to a group of Michigan investors and renamed Big Boy Restaurant Group.

In August 2020, a partnership was announced with Terrible Herbst to expand into Southern Nevada. On November 8, 2020, the first Big Boy restaurant opened in Indian Springs, Nevada. A second Big Boy opened in May 2022 in the Centennial Hills neighborhood of Las Vegas; called Big Boy Tavern, it includes a bar and small casino area. In June 2021, it was reported that a Big Boy restaurant will open on July 14, 2021, in Germantown, Wisconsin, a Milwaukee suburb. The franchisees will also operate two Big Boy food trucks and plan to open additional Big Boy restaurants in southeastern Wisconsin over a three-year period. The grand opening was pushed back to July 21 due to equipment shipping delays.

Big Boy Restaurants International tried a new fast casual concept known as Big Boy's Burgers and Shakes. The restaurant opened in 2016 in Mayfield Heights, Ohio, operated in strip mall instead of a larger traditional stand-alone building. The restaurant was closed by January 2020.

In November 2020, the Big Boy restaurant in Sandusky, Michigan was stripped of its franchise when it refused to comply with Michigan's COVID-19 restrictions.  It now operates as Sandusky Family Diner.

See also 
 List of hamburger restaurants
 List of casual dining restaurant chains
 List of franchises

Notes

References

Further reading

External links

 Official Big Boy company sites
 Big Boy Restaurant Group
 Frisch's Big Boy Restaurants 
 Big Boy (Restaurants) Japan partial English translation by Google
 Bob's Big Boy Restaurant, Burbank, CA
 Bismarck Big Boy, Bismarck, ND
 Wisconsin Big Boy, Germantown, WI
 Big Boy Thailand

 Other sites
 The Elby's (Big Boy) Empire. Part 1  2  3  4  5  6  7
 Roadside Peek: Big Boy Big Boy East Big Boy Japan
 RoadsideArchitecture: Big Boy Frisch's Big Boy
 Lendy's Web Pages
 Armet & Davis restaurant design renderings for Bob's Big Boy for Azar's Big Boy for Frisch's Big Boy for Kip's Big Boy

 
History of Los Angeles
Restaurants in California
Companies based in Macomb County, Michigan
Warren, Michigan
Restaurants in Michigan
Economy of the Midwestern United States
Culture of the Midwestern United States
Regional restaurant chains in the United States
Restaurants established in 1936
Companies that filed for Chapter 11 bankruptcy in 2000
Drive-in restaurants
Hamburger restaurants in the United States
Restaurant franchises
Buffet restaurants
Michigan culture
Theme restaurants
Marriott International brands
1936 establishments in California
American companies established in 1936
Food advertising characters
Male characters in advertising
Child characters in advertising